Fortuna Union Elementary School District was a public school district in Humboldt County, California, United States. Effective July 1, 2012, it consolidated with Rohnerville Elementary School District to form Fortuna Elementary School District.

References

School districts in Humboldt County, California
2012 disestablishments in California